The 11th millennium BC spanned the years 11,000 BC to 10,001 BC (c. 13 ka to c. 12 ka). This millennium is during the Upper Paleolithic period. It is impossible to precisely date events that happened during this millennium, and all dates associated with this millennium are estimates mostly based on geological analysis, anthropological analysis, and radiometric dating.

Geology

Animals

The faunal information from stratum 2 at Aetokremnos shows a familiarity with molluscs, sea birds, and reptiles, indicating that such animals were indigenous to the island in this millennium. There is an aurochs skull on a wall of a 'public building', a row of three wild sheep skulls in a public space and a snake carved from bone already at Hallan Çemi in Turkey during this millennium. In the Middle East, dogs were the first wild animal to be domesticated by human beings during this millennium.

Environmental changes

There is material evidence for the build up of the Mediterranean islands that is pointing to such activity as early as the 12-11th millennium BC. Current evidence from the Mediterranean islands indicates that seasonal exploitation and occupation may have occurred as early as this millennium. It solidly establishes a human presence on Cyprus, making it one of the oldest inhabited Mediterranean islands during this millennium. 

The largest central European volcanic event of the Late Pleistocene is estimated to have occurred in approximately 10,900 BC at the Laacher See in Germany. There was a Katla eruption that produced pumice which probably happened between about the 11th millennium BC and the late 8th millennium BC. The geochemistry of Katla and the archaeological pumice is also similar to that of the Vedde Ash, which was deposited in north-western Europe during this millennium. 

In some locations in Europe, obsidian suddenly appeared in deposits in this millennium, though the earliest artefacts made of obsidian date from a much later period. In the Aegean sea, the earliest evidence of Melian obsidian comes from Franchthi Cave, in late Upper Paleolithic levels during this millennium.

Ridges of Aeolian sand had formed over some earth deposits on the eastern side of the Vale of York at the foot of the Wolds. It was recorded in a test-pit at Low Grange Farm, Shiptonthorpe, and dated to 11,873-11,216 BC.

Sea level had risen to about 40–50 m below its present level during this millennium.

Human culture

Humans

The first inhabitants were discovered on the eastern shore of the Baltic sea in this millennium. Early coastal foragers were present at Aetokremnos on Cyprus, which suggests that the Eastern Mediterranean had marine technology during this millennium. There were inhabitants in the Franchthi Cave during this millennium. In the Pre-Neolithic period, there is indirect evidence of seafaring from Franchthi Cave in this millennium. Humans were occupying Guitarrero Cave and the shelter of Pachamachay during this millennium. The oldest inhabitants in Lithuania are representatives of the Brommian culture that arrived at The Lake Titnas flint mining sites in roughly the first half of this millennium.

The Clovis culture was present in the Americas during the 11th millennium. Under the Clovis first theory, it was believed that they became the first culture to populate the Americas in this millennium. There was a recent discovery of earlier cultures that were before the Clovis culture.

Agriculture and population

The development of agriculture started during this millennium. It is estimated that the world population stabilized at about one million people. The subsistence entailed hunting and foraging, a lifestyle that by its nature ensured a low population density.

Pottery

The world's earliest known pottery, from Japan, dates to this millennium.

Other cultural developments

The earliest known masseboth was constructed during this millennium. There was a formation of settled villages in the Middle East during this millennium. The nearest dated Paleoindian component is the Hiscock site, near Tonawanda, New York, in the present-day United States, dated to this millennium. Abu Hureyra was settled during this millennium, as evidenced by numerous pits and post- holes. Settlement at Mureybet began at the end of the Natufian period, around the end of this millennium. According to radiocarbon dating, Tower 5 is the fifth oldest tower in the world during this millennium. Tower 5 may be a shrine and/or "common house".

Notes

Bibliography

Books

Journals

Conference reports

 
 
 
 

Millennia
11th millennium BC